Oligoamenorrhea, also known as irregular infrequent periods or irregular infrequent menstrual bleeding, is a collective term to refer to both oligomenorrhea (infrequent periods) and amenorrhea (absence of periods). It is a menstrual disorder in which menstrual bleeding occurs on an infrequent and irregular basis. Menstrual intervals are 37 to 180days in oligoamenorrhea. Nearly 90% of women with oligoamenorrhea have polycystic ovary syndrome (PCOS).

References

Menstrual disorders